Keith Wayne Brown (born March 30, 1983) is an American football wide receiver who is currently a free agent.

On May 15, 2012, Brown signed a one-year contract for the 2012 National Football League season with the Houston Texans but never played due to injury. He was signed by the Detroit Lions as an undrafted free agent in 2006. Brown has also played for the Tampa Bay Buccaneers.

Early years
Brown attended Edward H. White High School in Jacksonville, Florida. He along with Dee Webb and Jamaal Fudge were elected to Ed White's Sports Wall of Fame in the same year. He played college football at the University of Rhode Island.

Professional career

Detroit Lions
Brown was signed by the Detroit Lions as an undrafted free agent in 2006. He was cut by the Lions in training camp in 2009.

Tampa Bay Buccaneers
Brown was signed May 2010 by the Tampa Bay Buccaneers to the practice roster after he was released by the Detroit Lions. He was waived on September 7, 2011.

Houston Texans
Brown signed a future contract with the Houston Texans for the 2012 season, but was placed on Injured Reserve.

References

External links

Living people
1983 births
Edward H. White High School alumni
Players of American football from Jacksonville, Florida
American football wide receivers
Rhode Island Rams football players
Detroit Lions players
Houston Texans players
Tampa Bay Buccaneers players